The Yves O. Fortier Earth Science Journalism Award is presented annually by the Geological Association of Canada to "a journalist who is a resident of Canada and who has been exceptionally effective in presenting one or more earth science stories during the previous 1-3 years in one of Canada's daily or weekly newspapers or periodicals." The award was established by and is named after Yves O. Fortier, a founding member of the Geological Association of Canada and a former Director of the Geological Survey of Canada.

Recipients 
Source: GAC

See also

 List of geology awards
 List of science communication awards
 Prizes named after people

References

Canadian journalism awards
Canadian science and technology awards
Geology awards
Science writing awards
Science communication awards